Lee Byung-chul (Korean: 이병철 12 February 1910 – 19 November 1987) was a South Korean businessman.  He was the founder of the Samsung Group, which is South Korea's largest chaebol, and he is considered one of South Korea's most successful businessmen.

Personal life

Early life
Byung-chul was the youngest son of four siblings to father Lee Chan-woo and mother Kwon Jae-lim. Byung-chul was the son of a wealthy land-owning yangban family (a branch of the Gyeongju Lee clan). He attended highschool at Joongdong High School in Seoul, and then college at Waseda University in Tokyo but did not complete his degree.

Korean art collection 
After his death, Byung-chul's estate (Ho-Am) was opened to the public for tours. His collection of Korean art is considered one of the largest private collections in the country, featuring a number of art objects that have been designated "National Treasures" by the Korean government. Ho-Am is located a short distance from the Everland park, one of South Korea's popular amusement parks (Everland is also owned by the Samsung Group).

Family

The family of Lee Byung-chul
 Lee Byung Chul (12 February 1910 ~ 19 November 1987) – 1st chairman of Samsung.
 1st wife: Park Du-eul (8 November 1907 ~ 3 January 2000)
 1st daughter: Lee In-hee (30 January 1929 ~ 30 January 2019) – The founder of Hansol and spouse of its former chairman, Dr. Cho Wan-hae, M.D. (5 August 1925 ~ 1 March 2019).
 1st son: Lee Maeng-hee (20 June 1931 ~ 14 August 2015) – Founder of CJ Group (in which he lost the lawsuitalongside with Lee Kun-hee), father of current CJ Group chairman Lee Jay-hyun.
 2nd son: Lee Chang-hee (24 May 1933 ~ 19 July 1991) – Founder of Saehan.
 2nd daughter: Lee Suk-hee (1935 ~ ), spouse of LG board director Koo Cha-hak (1930 ~), younger brother of the emeritus chairman, Koo Cha-kyung (1925 ~ 2019) and paternal uncle of the former deceased chairman, Koo Bon-moo (1945 ~ 2018).
 3rd daughter: Lee Soon-hee (1939 ~ ) 
 4th daughter: Lee Deok-hee (1940 ~ ), widow of Lee Jeong-gi (1936 ~ 2006).
 3rd son: Lee Kun-hee (9 January 1942 ~ 25 October 2020) – 2nd chairman of Samsung, father of 3rd and present Samsung chairman Lee Jae-yong and Hotel Shilla president Lee Boo-jin.
 5th daughter: Lee Myung-hee (1943 ~ ), spouse of Chung Jae-eun (1937 ~), chairwoman of Shinsegae group and mother of Chung Yong-jin.
 2nd wife: Kuroda (1922 ~ 2007)
 4th son: Lee Tae-whi (1947 ~ )
 6th daughter: Lee Hye-ja (1952 ~ )

Career

Beginning 
Byung-chul established a trucking business in Daegu on 1 March 1938, which he named Samsung Trading Co, the forerunner to Samsung. Samsung means "Three Stars" which explains the initial corporate logos.

By 1945 Samsung was transporting goods throughout Korea and to other countries. The company was based in Seoul by 1947. It was one of the ten largest "trading companies" when the Korean War started in 1950. With the conquest of Seoul by the North Korean army, Lee was forced to relocate his business to Busan. The massive influx of U.S. troops and equipment into Busan over the next year and a half of the war proved to be highly beneficial to Lee's trading company.

In 1961, when Park Chung-hee seized power in the May 16 coup, Lee was in Japan and for some time he did not return to South Korea. Eventually, a deal was struck and Lee returned but Samsung had to give up control over the banks it acquired and follow economic directives from Park's government.

Federation of Korean Industries 
The first step of the Federation of Korean Industries was established in August 1961. The association was founded by Samsung Group chairman Lee Byung-chul. 

Later in life, Byung-chul served as chairman of the Federation of Korean Industries and was known as the richest man  in Korea.

Other ventures 
In 1965, he established the Samsung Culture Foundation to promote a broad range of programs to enrich Korean cultural life.

In 1969, Samsung Electronics Manufacturing (renamed Samsung Electronics) and later merged with Samsung-Sanyo Electric. Samsung Electronics Manufacturing had 45 employees and about $250,000 sales in 1970 and it made household electronics exclusively.

In 1982, he was awarded an honorary doctorate from Boston College

See also

 List of people of Korean descent

References 

1910 births
1987 deaths
20th-century South Korean businesspeople
Samsung people
South Korean art collectors
South Korean Buddhists
South Korean company founders
Waseda University alumni
Lee family (South Korea)